Veronica Geng (January 10, 1941 – December 24, 1997) was an American fiction writer, critic, and magazine editor.

Life
Geng was born in Atlanta, Georgia, raised in Philadelphia and attended the University of Pennsylvania. She died in New York City of brain cancer, aged 56.

Literary career
Geng was an influential and acclaimed humorist who typically wrote short stories and essays. The Los Angeles Times called her "a brilliant contributor to The New Yorker and the quirky dark lady of Manhattan's literary scene, celebrated for her deadpan essays and revolving-door sex life." The New York Times said that Geng "carried on in the tradition of S.J. Perelman."

Starting in the early 1970s, Geng reviewed books for The New York Times for many years; during this time, she also wrote for the Village Voice. Her  parody of The New Yorker'''s film critic Pauline Kael, published in The New York Review of Books in 1975, caught the eye of Roger Angell, a New Yorker fiction editor. (He later called Geng "the hardest person he ever had to edit.") Geng began writing for The New Yorker in 1976 and became an assistant fiction editor.

Geng's work typically included elements of satire and parody, with allusions to both high culture and popular culture. Critics praised her humor pieces for their unusual coupling of subjects and control of style, e.g., the Watergate Tapes reviewed by a hip Rolling Stone critic, or a sitcom about the young Henry James. "Her thing was high, intellectual comedy," noted Charles McGrath, another New Yorker editor. The writer Kurt Andersen said Geng's pieces "felt as if they were created in a laboratory or an institute for advanced studies.” The author Ben Yagoda, in  About Town: The New Yorker and the World it Made, described her later writings as "subtle to the point of unintelligibility."

As a New Yorker editor, Geng worked closely with such writers as Philip Roth, Frederick Barthelme, Milan Kundera, William Trevor, James McCourt, and Ian Frazier. She developed a particularly close relationship with Roth, and was considered the unofficial editor of his novels. "I always gave Veronica my books," Roth said. He credited Geng with persuading William Shawn, the editor of The New Yorker, to publish his 1979 novella, The Ghost Writer, in two issues of the magazine. She remained at The New Yorker until 1992, leaving because of disagreements with the magazine's editor at the time, Tina Brown.

Geng was also a film reviewer in the 1970s and 1980s for The New Yorker, as well as Film Comment, American Film, Soho News, The New Republic and The New York Review of Books.American Film, 1970–1989The New Republic, 1970–1989 She wrote approving essays about Monty Python in The New Yorker and The New Republic.Geng, Veronica. The New Republic, April 23, 1990

Geng touched upon feminist issues in pieces such as "Women in Science Fiction," for Bookletter, "Requiem for the Women's Movement," for Harper's and "Comment" on the Equal Rights Amendment" for The New Yorker.Geng, Veronica. "Requiem for the Women's Movement," Harper's, November 1976

Family
In 2007, her brother, Steve Geng, published a memoir titled Thick as Thieves, which chronicled his relationship with his sister as well as his experiences of growing up as an army brat, drug addiction, time in jail, military experience, HIV and osteonecrosis.

 Bibliography Guess Who? A Cavalcade of Famous Americans, 1969In a Fit of Laughter: An Anthology of Modern Humor, 1969 (editor, with an introduction by Steve Allen)Cosmopolitan's Hangup Handbook, 1971 (editor, with Barbara Creaturo) Partners, 1984 
 Love Trouble is My Business, 1988 Summer, 1990 (contributor)Love Trouble: New and Collected Work'', 1999 (published posthumously, collects the two previous books and adds previously uncollected work)

References

1941 births
1997 deaths
20th-century American essayists
20th-century American short story writers
20th-century American women writers
American humorists
American satirists
Deaths from brain cancer in the United States
The New Yorker editors
The New Yorker staff writers
University of Pennsylvania alumni
Women magazine editors
Women satirists
Writers from Philadelphia